Karuse is a village in Lääneranna Parish, Pärnu County, in western Estonia. The village has twenty inhabitants (as of December 31, 2011).

Otto von Lutterberg is buried in the village church.

See also
Battle of Karuse

References

Villages in Pärnu County
Kreis Wiek